The 2015 Warsaw Cup was a senior international figure skating competition held in November 2015 in Warsaw, Poland. It was part of the 2015–16 ISU Challenger Series. Medals were awarded in the disciplines of men's singles, ladies' singles, pair skating, and ice dancing.

Entries
The preliminary entries were published on 5 November 2015.

Results

Men

Ladies

Pairs

Ice dancing

References

External links
 
 2015 Warsaw Cup results
 2015 Warsaw Cup at the International Skating Union

Warsaw Cup
Warsaw Cup, 2015
Warsaw Cup